P.A.O.K. Women's Basketball is part of the amateur section of the major Greek multi-sport club P.A.O.K. The club is based in Thessaloniki, Greece. The department was founded in 1967. P.A.O.K. Sports Arena is the home arena of the team.

Roster

Technical and managerial staff

Notable players
Completed list of former PAOK Women players by Eurobasket.com

  Maria Avtzi
  Nafsika Stavridou
  Faidra Skiadopoulou
  Elena Kyratzi
  Telidou Dimitra
  Kalampakou Aspasia 	
  Spanidou Stavroula
  Tarpagou Anthoula
  Tijana Raca
   Niky Avery
  Caila Desroches
  Aisha Jefferson
  Kenya McBee
  Clemons, Liza
  Redmon, Jazmine

See also
 P.A.O.K. BC

References

External links
 Official Website 
 PAOK Women Team Eurobasket.com

PAOK
 
Basketball teams established in 1967
Women's basketball teams in Greece
Basketball teams in Thessaloniki
1967 establishments in Greece